Roberto Eduardo Carboni (born 8 April 1985) is an Argentine retired football player, who last played for LÁ Firpo  in El Salvador.

Career
Roberto Carboni is a left midfielder who was born in Bernal and made his debut in professional football, being part of the Club Atlético Independiente squad in the 2004 season. 
During his first season for Independiente, Carboni played only 2 games. In the summer of 2005, he moved to All Boys in the Primera B Metropolitana, where he played a considerably larger number of matches.

In 2006 Carboni relocated to Venezuela, signing a contract with Estudiantes de Mérida. In season 2007/08 he played in other team of Primera División Venezolana - Deportivo Anzoátegui.

After spending six months of his career in Deportivo Cuenca, Carboni relocated to Europe in January 2009, signing a two-a-half year contract with Bulgarian Chernomorets Burgas. He made his competitive debut for Chernomorets on 7 March 2009 against Botev Plovdiv in the round of 16 of the Bulgarian top division.

References

External links
 Roberto Eduardo Carboni at BDFA.com.ar 

1985 births
Living people
Sportspeople from Buenos Aires Province
Argentine footballers
Argentine expatriate footballers
Club Atlético Independiente footballers
All Boys footballers
C.D. Cuenca footballers
PFC Chernomorets Burgas players
Estudiantes de Mérida players
APOP Kinyras FC players
FBC Melgar footballers
Argentine expatriate sportspeople in Bulgaria
Argentine Primera División players
First Professional Football League (Bulgaria) players
Peruvian Primera División players
Cypriot First Division players
Expatriate footballers in Mexico
Expatriate footballers in Ecuador
Expatriate footballers in Bulgaria
Expatriate footballers in Venezuela
Expatriate footballers in Peru
Expatriate footballers in Cyprus
Association football midfielders